The Columbia Climate School is Columbia University's school of trans-disciplinary climate research. Announced in July 2020, the Climate School is the first new school to be established at the university in 25 years. As of January 2021, the school has announced one degree program, a Master of Arts in Climate and Society. Since 2021, the Columbia Climate School has been the official university partner of The Climate Group for Climate Week NYC annually.

Leadership 
The school is led by founding dean Alexander Halliday (who also directs Columbia's Earth Institute) and co-founding deans Jason Bordoff, Ruth DeFries, and Maureen Raymo.

References 

Columbia University
Educational institutions established in 2020
2020 establishments in New York City